Two warships of Sweden have been named Sjöhästen, after Sjöhästen:

 , a  launched in 1940 and stricken in 1963.
 , a  launched in 1968 and sold to Singapore in 1997.

Swedish Navy ship names